Lagos State Junior Model College Badore is a state owned secondary school located in Badore village, Eti-Osa Local government area of Lagos State.

History 
Before 2003, junior and senior secondary schools in Lagos State were a single administrative control. The government through the Lagos State Ministry of Education mandated all secondary schools in the state to be partitioned into junior (JSS1-3) and senior (SS1-3). This was what led to the establishment of Lagos State Junior Model College Badore from Lagos State Model College Badore (founded on 19 February 1988) on January 6, 2003. The emergence of the newly created school led to the appointment of Mrs. Sidikat Titilayo Smith as the first principal of the school.

Facilities
Lagos State Junior Model College Badore has hostel facilities that accommodates all her students, thus operating a boarding only system.

Principals 
 Mrs Sidikat Titilayo Smith, January 2003 to 2011
 Mr F. A. Lawal, July 15, 2011, to 2017
 Mr Kayode Akinboro 13-9-17 to 10-9-19
 Mr R .T Ajetunmobi 10-9-2019 until date

Notable honours 
 Best Junior Secondary School in Education District 111. (2011 by Ministry of Education) 
 First position at Festival of Arts and Culture in Storytelling category (2011 by Ministry of Education)
 Second position in Quiz competition marking Second anniversary of Climate Change clubs. (2011 by Ministry of Environment)  
 First position in Essay competition. (2012 by Nigeria Conservation Foundation)
 First position in Agriculture Debate (2012 by Poultry Association of Nigeria)

References 

2003 establishments in Nigeria
Boarding schools in Nigeria
Secondary schools in Lagos State